Kieran Stevenson (born 1970) is a former hurler from Northern Ireland, who played as a goalkeeper at senior level for the Derry county team.

Stevenson joined the panel during the 1995 championship and subsequently became the first-choice goalkeeper until his retirement after the 2006 Nicky Rackard Cup.

At club level Stevenson is a one-time county club championship medalist with Banagher.

Honours
Derry
 Ulster Senior Hurling Championship (2) 2000 2001
 Nicky Rackard Cup (1) 2006
 Ulster Under-21 Hurling Championship (1) 1997
Club
 Derry Minor Hurling Championship (3) 1992 1993 1990
 Derry Senior Hurling League (2) 1999 2001
 Derry Senior Hurling Championship (1) 2000

References

1977 births
Living people
Banagher hurlers
Derry inter-county hurlers
Hurling goalkeepers
Ulster inter-provincial hurlers